Siege of Centauri is a tower defense video game developed by Stardock for Microsoft Windows. It takes place in the same universe as Ashes of the Singularity, a game developed by Oxide Games and published by Stardock. The game was released on September 12, 2019, earning mixed reviews as a standard implementation of the Tower Defense genre.

Gameplay 
Siege of Centauri is a tower defense video game where players must defend colonies from endless hordes of killer machines. The game takes place in the same universe as Ashes of the Singularity, a game developed by Oxide Games and published by Stardock. Different from most other tower defense games where players position their defenses on designated pedestals, players can drop turrets anywhere within a preset area. Different weapons have different advantages against different enemies, and defeating each level rewards the player with access to new weapons.

Reception 
Upon its release on September 12, 2019, Siege of Centauri received an average score of 68 on review aggregator Metacritic, indicating "mixed or average" reviews. Kyle Hilliard of PC Gamer described the game as "a basic tower defense game with many concepts I have used before and it did little to get me excited about what was coming next." Ollie Toms of Rock Paper Shotgun found the game enjoyable, while calling it “one of the most uninspired games I’ve ever played”. According to Cody Medillin of Worth Playing, Siege of Centauri is a game that a player "wouldn't mind playing but won't rush out to buy immediately, making this difficult to recommend unless you devour every game in the tower defense genre". While Jordan Boyrd of Screen Rant said that it "isn't a groundbreaking game," they also said it "does its job in doing justice to that niche despite a lackluster story and some technical issues". Tony Bae from COG Connected said that the game "felt dull after only a few hours of play", that they "didn’t feel a hint of passion in Siege of Centauri", and "[i]f there ever was a game that felt phoned-in, this is it." Still, Sean Anthony of Gaming Trend suggested that while the game "doesn’t do anything groundbreaking, it doesn’t necessarily do anything wrong for the genre."

References

External links 

2019 video games
Multiplayer and single-player video games
Tower defense video games
Stardock games
Video games developed in the United States
Windows games
Windows-only games
Transhumanism in video games